Logan's Sanctuary is an electronica album by Roger Joseph Manning Jr. and Brian Reitzell, conceived as the soundtrack for an imagined sequel to the film Logan's Run.

Manning's former bandmate in Jellyfish, Jason Falkner, contributed to two tracks. Also, photographs of Falkner dressed in costumes reminiscent of the film were incorporated into the CD booklet. Manning, Reitzell, and Falkner later formed the band TV Eyes, recording their first album between 2000 and 2003, although it was not released until 2006.

Track listing
"Islands In The Sky" - 2:39
"Search For Tomorrow" - 5:13
"The Game" - 4:24
"Lara's Rainbow" - 5:08
"Metropia" - 5:56
"Pleasure Dome 12" - 4:46
"Ian's Orbit" - 6:00
"Escape" - 3:27
"Endless Tunnels" - 6:10
"The Silver Garden" - 5:40

Personnel
 Roger Joseph Manning Jr. - Producer, Composer, Performer
 Brian Reitzell - Producer, Composer, Performer
 Jason Falkner - guitar on "Metropia"; lead vocal, guitar and bass on "Search For Tomorrow"
 Justin Meldal-Johnsen - bass on "Lara's Rainbow", "Metropia", "Ian's Orbit", and "Endless Tunnels"

External links

Album information at Discogs.com
 Album review
Jason Falkner website listing of session work

Albums produced by Brian Reitzell
2000 albums
Emperor Norton Records albums
Science fiction concept albums